Tutonish (also called Teutonish, Teutonik, Allteutonish, Altutonish, Alteutonik, Nu Teutonish, Niu Teutonish, or Neuteutonish) is a constructed language created by Elias Molee. He worked on it for several years, and he reformed it multiple times, in 1906 under the name nu teutonish, in 1911 under the name altutonish and in 1915 under the name alteutonik. It is known to be the first Pan-Germanic language.

In creating it, Molee was clearly influenced by Giuseppe Peano but chose to create a language for people based on Germanic roots instead of Romance ones. However, he created an "inter-Romance" version of his language to be used among Romance-speaking people as well.

The Four Fundamental Principles (Alteutonik, 1915) 
Molee's points to several principles his work is based on. 
1st principle
The ease of the suggestive action is as strong in proportion to the number of times the words and ideas have been associated in consciousness. (Herbert Spencer); All teutonic children have heard of the homogeneous words arm and bone; hence armbone would be more suggestive than the Latin heterogeneous humerus. 
2nd principle
The more mental energy required to master the words, the less mental energy is left for the ideas contained.
3rd principle
Language should proceed from the known to the unknown.
4th principle
Language should proceed from the simple to the complex.

Inside his works Molee often reclaims that zonal constructed language strictly should be "selvklar" (self-explanatory) and homogeneous.

Characteristics 
Tutonish had a simple phonetic pronunciation, a simple grammar based on the English grammar ("Fifteen rules") and a simple orthography, without majuscule. The "Germanic" version's vocabulary was built on roots taken from English, Dutch, German and Scandinavian languages, while the "Romance" version's vocabulary was mostly built on Latin and Romance languages.

Copyleft 
Alteutonik, 1915, page 38, mentioned copyleft "kein ferfasero rekt"; "nur to erwana e ferfasr" (only author needs to be mentioned).

Criticism 
Louis Couturat and Léopold Leau wrote, in their Histoire de la langue universelle, not very enthusiastically about Tutonish. That verifies Tutonish has to be categorized Zonal constructed language.
Without criticizing the project of Monsieur Molee, he must permit as to note that he is inspired by motives absolutely opposite to human and civilization scopes of international language and to neutrality postulated in it.

Examples

The Germanic version (Tutonish 1901, N(i)u Teutonish 1906, Alteutonik ) of the Lord's Prayer

The Romance version of the Lord's Prayer

Numbers from one to ten (according to Alteutonik, 1915)

The origins of Tutonish – 
Elias Molee, the author of tutonish, was born on January 3, 1845 to parents who emigrated from Norway, in a place 30 kilometers from Milwaukee ... in the entire neighborhood there was a lot of other children who only spoke their own Germanic mother tongues.

Some sentences
 "Thou shalt not bear false witness against thy neighbor."

See also 
 Folkspraak

Bibliography 
 Molee, Elias:
 Plea for an American Language, or Germanic-English. Chicago, 1888.
 "Germanik English". Bristol [S.D.] Bristol news print., 1889. 64 p. 21 cm.
 Pure Saxon English. Chicago & New York, 1890.
 Tutonish or Anglo-German Union Tongue. Chicago, Scroll Publishing Company, 1902. 206 p., 16 cm.
 "Nu Tutonish, an International Union Language"; Tacoma, 1906.
 "Tutonish, an international union language", London, K. Paul, Trench, Trubner & co., ltd, 1908. 48 p. 22 cm.
 "Tutonish, et internationalt faellessprog under angelsaksisk ledelse"; Kristiania, Tutonish forlag, i hovedkommission hos H. M. Lund [1909] 44 p. illus. 22 cm.
 "Tutonish; a Teutonic international language", Tacoma, Washington, U. S., E. Molee [c. 1961] 9 p. illus. 15 cm.

External links

 Molee's books on Archive.org
 Radio Gran project to translate Alteutonik (1915) written part into German.
 Elias Molee Collection, with a biography of Elias Molee.

Pan-Germanic languages
Zonal constructed languages
Constructed languages introduced in the 1900s
1901 introductions